John Wesley Metcalf  (born 12 November 1938) is an English-born Canadian writer, editor and critic.

Biographical
Metcalf was born in Carlisle, England on 12 November 1938. His father, Thomas Metcalf, was a clergyman and his mother, Gladys Moore Metcalf, was a teacher. Metcalf immigrated to Canada in 1962. It was in Canada that he began to write. In 1975 he married Myrna Teitelbaum and now lives with her in Ottawa, Ontario, Canada.

He has made extensive contributions to Canadian literature through editing, teaching various educational levels across Canada, critiquing other writers, compiling anthologies and publishing and promoting Canadian writers. He is a "storyteller, editor, novelist, essayist, critic", and is known for his satires of Canadian life and academia. His writing is rich in intense emotion invoking imagery, which he draws from his experiences as an educator in Canada. Many in his field view Metcalf as an authority in writing and criticism.

Education
Metcalf gained an Honours Bachelor of Arts and a Certificate in Education from the University of Bristol, prior to his immigration to Canada.

Writing career
His first attempt at writing fiction came when he entered the Canadian Broadcasting Corporation's Short Story Essay Contest which was followed by eight of his short stories being accepted by the Vancouver-based magazine Prism International. He supplemented his writing career with teaching jobs.

New Canadian Writing 1969 included Metcalf's first published stories. They followed a common theme of young people coming of age. Metcalf used the coming-of-age theme, and the events that shape it, extensively throughout his works. His first novella, The Lady Who Stole Furniture, was published in 1970, shortly after New Canadian Writing 1969. The narrator deals with the morality and integrity of his intimate relationship with an older woman. This novella first showcased Metcalf's "skill with dialogue, the idiom and rhythms of speech", which is seen in most of his work.
Many of his works follow characters modeled after himself, many are young English teachers who have immigrated to Canada and are displeased with the state of the educational system. His first novel Going Down Slow follows a young teacher as described above as he deals with morality in the workplace, and his second novel, General Ludd, describes a similar character, fighting the implementation of communications technology in his workplace.
The Teeth of My Father is a collection of short stories with the common theme of artists' relationships with society and their artwork and personal life. This theme was followed by, and extended in Metcalf's Adult Entertainment.
Girl in Gingham is a collection of two novellas. The first, Private Parts, chronicles one narrator's "sexual and spiritual childhood and adolescence". The second, Girl in Gingham, follows another narrator's search for the perfect mate via an online dating service, with the undertone being his realization of people trying to invent themselves to fit what others want, or the ideals of their culture. Short story and Novella forms are Metcalf's preferred form of writing. Metcalf describes that when writing these forms "you got to get it dead right. A beat or two off and it's ruined."
Metcalf is a long-time critic of Canadian "cultural and educational inadequacies", and published Kicking Against the Pricks in 1982 to showcase this frustration. It was a collection of 8 essays and included an interview with himself. To encourage debate on this theme within the literary community, he published The Bumper Book in 1986 and followed it with Carry On Bumping in 1988. Both collections consisted of contentious essays focussing on problems with Canadian literature.
In an interview with Geoff Hancock, Metcalf asserted that "the quality of the education has declined everywhere over the last 50 years as the number to be educated has risen". He is in "conflict with the dominant nature of North American society" and the influence it has on education.

Awards
Forde Abroad won the 1996 Gold Medal for Fiction at the National Magazine Awards.
The Estuary won University of Western Ontario's President's Medal for the Best Story of 1969.
Metcalf was appointed as a Member of the Order of Canada in 2004.

Selected works
 The Lady Who Sold Furniture, 1970
 Going Down Slow, 1972
 The Teeth of My Father, 1975
 Girl in Gingham, 1978
 General Ludd, 1981
 Kicking Against the Pricks, 1982
 Selected Stories, 1982
 Adult Entertainment, 1986
 What is a Canadian Literature?, 1988
 Shooting the Stars, 1992
 Freedom from Culture, 1993
 An Aesthetic Underground: A Literary Memoir, 2003
 Forde Abroad, 2003
 Standing Stones, 2004
 Shut Up He Explained: A Literary Memoir Volume II, 2007
 The Museum at the End of the World, 2016

Sources

Further reading
 Reingard M. Nischik: The English Short Story in Canada: From the Dawn of Modernism to the 2013 Nobel Prize. McFarland, 2017 (ch. 12, pp 176 sequ.; and passim)

External links
John Metcalf's entry in The Canadian Encyclopedia

1938 births
Canadian male short story writers
Canadian literary critics
Living people
Canadian male novelists
Members of the Order of Canada
20th-century Canadian short story writers
21st-century Canadian short story writers
20th-century Canadian novelists
21st-century Canadian novelists
20th-century Canadian male writers
21st-century Canadian male writers
Canadian male non-fiction writers